Ekaterina Andreyevna Lisunova (née Pantyulina on 6 October 1989) is a Russian water polo player. She competed at the 2008 and 2012 Summer Olympics and finished in seventh and sixth place, respectively, and was part of the Russian 2016 Summer Olympic team that won the bronze medal.

She is married to the water polo player Sergey Lisunov, they have a son.

See also
 Russia women's Olympic water polo team records and statistics
 List of Olympic medalists in water polo (women)
 List of players who have appeared in multiple women's Olympic water polo tournaments
 List of World Aquatics Championships medalists in water polo

References

External links
 

Russian female water polo players
1989 births
Living people
Olympic water polo players of Russia
Water polo players at the 2008 Summer Olympics
Water polo players at the 2012 Summer Olympics
World Aquatics Championships medalists in water polo
Water polo players at the 2016 Summer Olympics
Olympic bronze medalists for Russia
Olympic medalists in water polo
Medalists at the 2016 Summer Olympics
Sportspeople from Lviv
Universiade medalists in water polo
Universiade gold medalists for Russia
Medalists at the 2013 Summer Universiade
21st-century Russian women